Martyn LeNoble (born 14 April 1969) is a Dutch bassist and a founding member of the alternative rock band Porno for Pyros.

He started his musical career by playing bass in a Dutch punk rock band when he was 14. In 1989, he moved to Los Angeles and played with Thelonious Monster and the Too Free Stooges. In 1992, he joined Peter DiStefano, Stephen Perkins and Perry Farrell to form Porno for Pyros.

LeNoble has worked, recorded, toured, or performed with artists including Jane's Addiction, the Cult, Dave Gahan, Scott Weiland, Mark Lanegan, Soulsavers, Daniel Lanois, Maria McKee, Sarah McLachlan, Layne Staley, Tom Morello, and Josh Klinghoffer.

Personal life 
In 2008, LeNoble began dating actress Christina Applegate. LeNoble and Applegate became engaged on Valentine's Day 2010, and married in February 2013. It is the second marriage for both. They have one daughter, Sadie Grace LeNoble, born on 27 January 2011.

Discography 
Thelonious Monster – Beautiful Mess (1992, Capitol Records)
Porno for Pyros – Porno for Pyros (1993, Warner Bros. Records)
Porno for Pyros – Good God's Urge (1996, Warner Bros. Records)
Scott Weiland – 12 Bar Blues (1998, Atlantic Records)
Class of '99 - "Another Brick in the Wall (Part 2)" from The Faculty (1998, Columbia Records)
Perry Farrell – Rev (compilation) (1999, Warner Bros. Records)
Banyan - "Buzzards & Worms" on Anytime at All (1999, CyberOctave)
The Cult – Beyond Good and Evil (2001, Atlantic Records)
Perry Farrell – Song Yet to Be Sung (2001, Virgin Records)
Mike Martt – Tomorrow Shines Bright (2003, Superscope Records)
Jane's Addiction – Strays (2003, Capitol Records)
Dave Gahan - Live Monsters (2004, Mute Records)
Keith Caputo - A Fondness for Hometown Scars (2008, Suburban Records)
Soulsavers - Broken (2009, V2 Records)
Mark Lanegan Band - Blues Funeral (2012, 4AD)
Soulsavers - The Light the Dead See (2012, V2 Records)
Mark Lanegan Band - Phantom Radio (including No Bells on Sunday EP) (2014, Vagrant Records)
Dave Gahan & Soulsavers - Angels & Ghosts  (2015, Columbia Records)
Soulsavers - Kubrick (2015, San Quentin Recordings)
Wildlights - Wildlights (2015, Season of Mist)
Mark Lanegan Band - Gargoyle (2017, Heavenly Recordings)
Mark Lanegan Band - Somebody's Knocking (2019, Heavenly Recordings)
Thelonious Monster - Oh That Monster (2020, V2 Records)
Dave Gahan & Soulsavers - Imposter  (2021, Columbia Records)

References 

1969 births
Living people
20th-century Dutch male musicians
20th-century Dutch musicians
21st-century Dutch musicians
Alternative rock bass guitarists
Alternative rock guitarists
Atlantic Records artists
Class of '99 members
Dutch bass guitarists
Dutch emigrants to the United States
Dutch expatriates in the United States
Dutch male guitarists
Dutch rock bass guitarists
Dutch rock guitarists
Jane's Addiction members
Male bass guitarists
People from Vlaardingen
Porno for Pyros members
The Cult members
The Wondergirls members